The Pan American Judo Confederation (PJC) is an international organization comprising most of the national Judo federations and associations of the Americas, and is one of five such continental organizations recognized by the International Judo Federation. The PJC replaced the Pan American Judo Union (PJU) when it was founded in 2009, a decision which has been contested by the remaining members of the PJU.

Events
 Judo at the Pan American Games
 Judo at the Central American Games
 Judo at the South American Games
 Judo at the Central American and Caribbean Games
 Pan American Judo Championships
 Pan American Junior Judo Championships
 Pan American Cadet Judo Championships
 Pan American U15 Judo Championships
 South American Judo Championships
 South American Junior Judo Championships
 South American Cadet Judo Championships

See also
European Judo Union
List of judo organizations
Judo by country

References

International Judo Federation

Pan-American sports governing bodies